Home and Away is an Australian soap opera. The following is a list of characters that first appeared in 2000, by order of appearance. They were all introduced by the show's  executive producer John Holmes. The 13th season of Home and Away began airing on the Seven Network on 31 January 2000. The first introduction of the year was Leah Poulos, played by Ada Nicodemou in March. In May, Spencer McLaren arrived as Kieran Fletcher, a love interest for established character Sally Fletcher (Kate Ritchie). The following month saw the arrival of a new family, the Sutherlands consisting of Rhys, Shelley and their three daughters, Dani, Kirsty and Jade. Rowena Wallace arrived as June, the mother of established character Harry Reynolds. Susie Rugg debuted as Brodie Hanson in July. Beau Brady joined the cast as Noah Lawson in September. Ben Steel began playing Noah's older brother, Jude in October.

Leah Patterson-Baker

Leah Patterson-Baker (née Poulos, previously Patterson) is a fictional character, played by Ada Nicodemou, debuted on-screen during the episode airing on 22 March 2000. In 1999, Nicodemou was approached by the producers of Home and Away with an offer of a six-month contract. Nicodemou was not required to audition and began filming in November that year. Before Leah appeared on-screen, Nicodemou had already been offered an extension to her contract. 
Yahoo!7 describe Leah as "a single mother who has a strong work ethic and stands up for what she believes in." "Leah has a confidence about her that makes her shine. She's easy going and fun loving."  Nicodemou has received several award nominations for her performance as Leah. She was nominated for the Gold Logie Award for Most Popular Personality on Australian Television at the 2001, 2002 and 2006 Logie Awards, and also received "Most Popular Actress" nominations in 2002 and 2006. She was nominated for the "Best Actress" award at the 2009 Inside Soap Awards. At the 2010 and 2011 ceremonies she was nominated in the category of "Best Daytime Star".

Kieran Fletcher
	
Kieran Fletcher, played by Spencer McLaren made his first appearance in May 2000 and departed on 15 June 2000. Kieran was one of McLaren's first roles after graduating from NIDA in 1999.

Kieran meets Sally Fletcher (Kate Ritchie) while on an archaeological holiday in Ireland and they return to Summer Bay and announce their engagement much to the shock of Sally's friends. Kieran begins flirting with Gypsy Nash (Kimberley Cooper) who rejects his advances and threatens to expose his behaviour to Sally. However, Kieran tells Gypsy given her reputation, no-one will believe her. On the day of the wedding, Gypsy objects during vows and confesses to Kieran trying to make a move on her. Sally refuses to believe her at first but Hayley Smith (Bec Cartwright) and Colleen Smart (Lyn Collingwood) verify her story as they both witnessed Kieran grab Gypsy several times. Sally, upset, demands the truth and runs out of the church and the wedding is called off. Steven Matheson (Adam Willits), Sally's foster brother confronts Kieran on the beach and beats him up.  He leaves soon after.

Jade Sutherland

Jade Sutherland is a fictional character from the Australian Channel Seven soap opera Home and Away, played by Kate Garven. She appeared in the series from 19 June 2000 until 3 June 2004.Jade was Garven's first role on television. Garven said that working on Home and Away was a fun experience and that she had developed a good working relationship with those who play her on-screen family. Jade is portrayed as the "quieter" and "dreamy" of the Sutherland sisters, a keen book reader who likes to help out those less fortunate than herself. Jade is prone to illness and is a long sufferer of asthma. Jade's family see her as "fragile" and "vulnerable" and feel the need to treat her with care. The serial's official website describe her as being "stronger that many people realise" despite her fragile nature. Garven described Jade stating that "she is a nice person and a very sweet girl." In Philip Ardagh's book of howlers, blunders and random mistakery, Ardagh claimed that Jade and Kirsty's "amazing telepathic empathy" was conveniently forgotten by scriptwriters when they were revealed to be unrelated. He added that it must have been a "surprise" to viewers who had previously seen their connection play out. A columnist for the Sunday Mail thought the plot was questionable and said "A family arrive and claim Jade was swapped at birth with their daughter. You couldn't make it up."

Dani Sutherland

Dani Sutherland, played by Tammin Sursok, made her first screen appearance as Dani on 19 June 2000. The actress successfully auditioned for the role of Dani in 1999 and she called the experience "incredible". After four years in the role, Sursok decided to leave Home and Away to pursue a music career and other acting opportunities Sursok later revealed that her frustration with the soap's producers also contributed to her exit.  She later explained that she had also become frustrated with the serial's producers. Sursok was glad that her character was written out of the show without anything bad happening to her. For her portrayal of Dani, Sursok won the Most Popular New Female Talent Logie Award in 2001. Three years later, she was nominated for the Most Popular Actress Logie. Linda Barnier of the Newcastle Herald branded Dani "unlucky-in-love", while The Sydney Morning Herald's Robin Oliver called her "a go-getter".

Kirsty Sutherland

Kirsty Sutherland (previously Phillips), played by Christie Hayes first appeared on-screen during the episode airing on 19 June 2000. Actress Christie Hayes auditioned for the role when she was thirteen years old and secured it. In 2008 it was revealed that Hayes was returning to the serial and likened it to returning home when she stated: "It felt like coming home after I had moved out already, everything changed but was really still the same, it was refreshing and exciting."
Hayes decided to leave the serial again the following year and filmed her final scenes in August. She cited that the time felt right, but added she was happy she had come back for the time she had. 
The Armidale Express commented on Kirsty's relationship with Kane stating: "The Romeo and Juliet love story between Kane and love interest Kirsty (played by Christie Hayes) still remains one of the greatest (if not most controversial) Home And Away love stories." Soap opera coverage website Holy Soap branded her final episode as a real tear jerker. Holy soap also brand her wedding to Kane as "bizarre" because of the double wedding and stated "it's little wonder" that the pair had a private wedding.

Rhys Sutherland

Rhys Sutherland, portrayed by actor Michael Beckley debuted on screen during the episode airing on 19 June 2000. Beckley spent 20 years as a theatre actor before he joined the cast of Home and Away he told Joanne McCarthy of the Newcastle Herald. Sacha Molitorisz of The Sydney Morning Herald said that the episode featuring Rhys and Beth's wedding was better suited to "die hard fans". They criticised the plot for being "unengaging" and opined that the music, performances and dialogue were "painful" and "patchy".

Shelley Sutherland

Shelley Sutherland, portrayed by actress Paula Forrest  19 June 2000 and departed in 2002. She made sporadic returns in 2003 and 2004. Forrest made a brief return to the serial in 2009 in order to facilitate her on-screen daughter, Kirsty's (Christie Hayes) departure.

June Reynolds
	
June Reynolds, portrayed by actress Rowena Wallace, made her first appearance on 29 June 2000. and made her final appearance on 28 February 2003.

June is the mother of Harry Reynolds (Justin Melvey). She arrives in the Bay to stay with Harry and his landlord Donald Fisher (Norman Coburn) and her direct nature manages to annoy several residents. June prepares to leave but Donald convinces her to stay and he admits that he is envious of her skill as a writer and June tells him he has the better imagination and he should get his book "Letter to Byron" published. Harry confronts June over the content of her autobiography, which paints his late father, Frank in a bad light. After a heated conversation, Harry and June reconcile before she leaves.  June returns to the bay several months later when Harry decides to leave for the Whitsundays after burning his bridges in Summer Bay and they leave in a seaplane.

On June's next visit to the bay, she rekindles her relationship with Donald and they grow closer together and she helps organise the school's Rock Eisteddfod. It is soon revealed June is a kleptomaniac when she is caught on camera stealing Alex Poulos' (Danny Raco) watch at VJ Patterson's christening. When money disappears from the Diner, June is accused and overhears Donald doubting her innocence. She is cleared but leaves Summer Bay hurt. 
On Donald's final day as principal of Summer Bay High, June makes a surprise return and they leave for the Whitsundays together and later marry. In 2007, Donald returns and confirms he and June have since divorced.

Brodie Hanson

Brodie Hanson portrayed by actress Susie Rugg appeared between 2000 and 2002.  In 2004, Andrew Fraser from Inside Soap revealed that when Brodie returns she would be involved in a "sizzling love triangle" and a dramatic car crash. Sacha Molitorisz of The Sydney Morning Herald said that the episode featuring Brodie and Hayley's car crash was better suited to "die hard fans". They criticised the plot for being "unengaging" and opined that the music, performances and dialogue were "painful" and "patchy". They also stated "The problem is, simply piling one melodrama on top of another will not of itself make for good TV. The characters need to be explored, too. Otherwise the result will be superficial."

Noah Lawson

Noah Lawson, played by Beau Brady, debuted on-screen during the episode airing on 6 September 2000. Jacqueline Maley writing for The Sydney Morning Herald refers to Noah as a "bad boy" type character. For his portrayal of Noah, Brady was nominated for the "Most Popular New Male Talent" Logie in 2001. He was also nominated for the Silver Logie for "Most Popular Actor" for three years in a row from 2003 to 2005. The episode featuring Noah's funeral won writer Louise Crane-Bowes an Australian Writers Guild award in 2005. The episode featuring Noah's appearance as a ghost to say goodbye to Hayley also earned a nomination in this category in the same year.

Jude Lawson

Jude Lawson, played by Ben Steel, first appeared on-screen during the episode airing on 30 October 2000 and departed on 12 September 2002. For his portrayal of Jude, Steel was nominated for the "Best New Male Talent" Logie Award in 2001.

Others

References

, 2000
, Home and Away